The Ifinger is a mountain in the Sarntal Alps in South Tyrol, Italy.

References 
 Alpenverein South Tyrol

External links 

Mountains of the Alps
Mountains of South Tyrol
Sarntal Alps